Cassandra Latham-Jones is a British witch. She lives and works in the small community of St Buryan, Cornwall.

She is notable as being the first person in the UK to have registered her occupation as village witch with the Inland Revenue in the year 1996. Her services were especially required by hospital patients. Within one year she was having so many requests for her services that she became a self-employed witch and was no longer financially supported by the government.

She was previously a committee member of the Pagan Federation as vice president overseeing campaigning.

In the late 1980s Latham was a student at the experimental Dartington College of Arts, where she completed a bachelor's degree in theatre. Before enrolling in this program she had served as a nurse, caring for the builder of the Minack Theatre, Rowena Cade in the last years of her life. 
Cassandra's partner Laetitia utilises Aromatherapy, Reflexology, Indian Head Massage and Reiki. She also has a certificate as a sexual abuse counsellor.

References
Jones, Kelvin I. (1998) Seven Cornish Witches. Penzance: Oakmagic Publications 
Cornish World, No. 13, Juni/Juli/August 1997, page 14

External links

 Home Page
 Village Wisewoman www.villagewisewoman.co.uk  Folk
 Cassandra speaking at a conference in 2000, before she became Vice President of the Pagan Federation0

Living people
British modern pagans
Year of birth missing (living people)